"The Salmon Dance" is a song by English electronic music duo the Chemical Brothers and is the seventh track on their 2007 studio album We Are the Night. It features vocals by Fatlip and was released as the second single from the album on 10 September 2007.

The video, directed by Dom and Nic, features a boy (played by British actor Rory Jennings) looking at his fish tank, which is home to Fatlip the Piranha, his friend "Sammy the Salmon" (actually a squirrel fish), Puffa the beatboxing pufferfish, a lionfish, and various other tropical fish such as seahorses, butterflyfish, angelfish and tangs. It is featured in season three, episode three "The Black Clock of Time" of Bored to Death.

The single has reached number 10 on the New Zealand RIANZ Singles Chart, mainly due to downloads and airplay. It also reached number 27 on the UK Singles Chart, and as of 2017, remains their last UK top 40 hit. Its video was also nominated for a MTV Europe Music Award in 2007.

Track listings
UK 7-inch single
 "The Salmon Dance" (album version)
 "Snooprah"

UK 12-inch single
 "The Salmon Dance" (album version)
 "Electronic Battle Weapon 8"
 "The Salmon Dance" (Crookers 'Wow' mix)
 "The Salmon Dance" (Hervé mix)

UK CD single
 "The Salmon Dance" (radio edit) – 3:07
 "Electronic Battle Weapon 8" – 6:32

iTunes remix single
 "The Salmon Dance (Heavily Smoked By the Glimmers)

Charts

References

2007 singles
2007 songs
The Chemical Brothers songs
Astralwerks singles
Songs written by Tom Rowlands
Songs written by Ed Simons